Wheels & Tracks was a military history magazine covering the history of military vehicles worldwide and published quarterly in the United Kingdom by After The Battle publication.

It was founded by Bart Vanderveen in 1982. When Vanderveen died in 2001, publication ceased. The final issue was issue 75, April 2001.

At about that time, two monthly magazines by rival publishers Military Machines International and Classic Military Vehicles appeared in newsagents.

References

History magazines published in the United Kingdom
Quarterly magazines published in the United Kingdom
Defunct magazines published in the United Kingdom
Magazines established in 1982
Magazines disestablished in 2001
Military magazines published in the United Kingdom
1982 establishments in the United Kingdom
2001 disestablishments in the United Kingdom